Oberea coxalis is a species of longhorn beetle in the tribe Saperdini in the genus Oberea, discovered by Gressitt in 1940.

References

C
Beetles described in 1940